Sonic is a telecommunications company and internet service provider based in Santa Rosa, California, acting as a competitive local exchange carrier  in the San Francisco Bay Area, Sacramento, and Los Angeles.

History
Sonic began as an effort to bring network connectivity and Internet access to staff and students at the campus of Santa Rosa Junior College. In 1994, Sonic began formal Internet operations by way of a partnership between Dane Jasper and Scott Doty, both of whom had worked on the network at Santa Rosa Junior College. In 1995, Sonic moved into its downtown Santa Rosa location.

In 2011, after becoming concerned about increasing legal requests for users' data, mostly related to copyright infringement involving pornography, Sonic cut the time it stores logs of user activity to two weeks.

Later in 2011, the U.S. government forced Sonic and Google to turn over e-mail addresses of people who had corresponded with WikiLeaks volunteer and Tor developer Jacob Appelbaum. Sonic and Google fought the secret court order, which CEO Dane Jasper characterized as "rather expensive, but the right thing to do," and the court agreed to lift the seal on the Sonic order to give Appelbaum a copy of it.

In 2012, Jasper told TorrentFreak that Sonic will not be participating in the so-called "six strikes" plan, in which major U.S. Internet service providers will begin to warn and punish people suspected of infringing copyrights, saying that ISPs are not equipped to police the actions of individuals, and that the MPAA and RIAA have not invited small, independent ISPs to participate.

In late 2014, Sonic.net rebranded as Sonic, after acquiring sonic.com and @sonic twitter handle.

In April 2015, the company partnered with AT&T to expand service, using fiber-to-the-node. Due to this partnership, Sonic customers have to follow AT&T policies, including any access given to the federal government. Sonic customers can utilize a VPN to avoid AT&T policies and Sonic requests court orders for any investigations requested by the law.

In December 2018, Sonic announced a partnership with eero inc., creator of the first whole-home WiFi mesh system, to improve WiFi connectivity across the entire home.

Services
Sonic offers a number of services including:

 10 Gigabit Fiber – residential product
 Gigabit Fiber – combined voice (VoIP) and data service offering up to 1,000Mbit/s per line using Passive Optical Networking, with unlimited nationwide land line voice. Sonic has full control of the line: subscribers are on Sonic's IP space. Available in select markets, currently only Northern California locations.
 Fusion ADSL2+ – combined voice (POTS) and data service offering up to 20Mbit/s per line, with unlimited nationwide land line voice. Sonic has full control of the line: subscribers are on Sonic's IP space.
 Fusion VDSL2 – combined voice (POTS) and data service offering up to 75Mbit/s with the same limitations as Fusion ADSL2+. This subscription is served from a CO where Sonic has full control of the line cards and therefore remove any artificial limitation in speed that a subscriber can get. The requirement for getting this service is an individual has to be relatively close to the CO, up to 4000 feet. X2 is also available which will roughly double the speed.
 Fusion FTTN (VDSL2) – combined voice (VoIP) and data service offering from 20Mbit/s up to 75Mbit/s through bonding (X2), with unlimited nationwide land line voice. This is resold AT&T U-verse. Single pair connection is limited to 50Mbit/s even if the line is capable of more than that; bonded pair is limited to 75Mbit/s. Sonic has some control of the line such as not enforcing transfer caps, but customers are on AT&T's IP space. VoIP connection defaults to G.729ab and uses less than 50 Kbps.
 FlexLink – midband Ethernet service offering symmetric speeds from 1.5Mbit/s to 500Mbit/s.
 AT&T DSL – ADSL service delivered over an AT&T voice line. This service is obsolete and Sonic is no longer accepting legacy ADSL1 subscriptions.
 Hosting – website hosting services.
 Colocation – datacenter colocation in Santa Rosa, CA.

See also
 List of broadband providers in the United States
 ITU G.992.5

References

External links
 

1994 establishments in California
Broadband
Companies based in Sonoma County, California
Companies based in Santa Rosa, California
Telecommunications companies established in 1994
Fiber to the premises
Internet service providers of the United States
Telecommunications companies of the United States